Kulpreet Yadav (born 14 January 1968) is an Indian novelist, screenwriter and an actor. He is the author of thirteen books, including The Girl Who Loved a Pirate and The Girl Who Loved a Spy. 
The Girl Who Loved a Pirate is India's first thriller based on marine piracy and hijacking.

Biography 
Kulpreet was born in Chennai and completed graduation in Science from Nowrosjee Wadia College, Pune. He completed his post-graduation in journalism and mass communication from Amity University, Noida in 2004 and management courses from IIM, Indore, and IIM, Lucknow.

He joined the Naval Officer's Academy and served for two decades. In 2007 he was awarded the director general's Commendation for professionalism and dedication to the nation. He retired voluntarily in the rank of commandant with the Indian Coast Guard in 2014.

Kulpreet lives in Delhi with his wife Seema and daughters Leah and Jeanie.

Bibliography
 The Bet (Frog Books, 2006)
 A Waiting Wave (Pustak Mahal, 2011)
 India Unlimited—Stories from a Nation Caught Between Hype & Hope (Lifi Publications, 2013)
 Catching the Departed (Tara books, 2014)
 The Girl Who Loved a Pirate, Andy Karan #2 (Rumour Books, 2015)
 The Girl Who Loved a Spy, Andy Karan #1 (Rumour Books, 2016)
 Murder in Paharganj (Bloomsbury, 2017)
In Love With Simran (Srishti Publications)
The Last Love Letter ( Rupa Publications, 2019)
Queens Of Crime – Co-authored along with Sushant Singh (Penguin India, 2019)
The Darjeeling Ghost
UNLOVED IN NUDE TOWN (Ebook)
The City of Mirrors
The Battle Of Rezang La

Awards
 2014 & 2016: Shortlisted for DNA-Out of Print Short fiction contest.
 2018, Best Fiction Writer (Gurgaon Literature Festival) for "Murder In Paharganj".

See also
 List of Indian writers

References

External links
 Official website
 A Man with Many Sides – Kulpreet Yadav – An Exclusive Interview

Living people
1968 births
21st-century Indian novelists
People from Chennai
English-language writers from India
Indian male novelists
Indian thriller writers
Novelists from Delhi
21st-century Indian male writers
Indian male film actors
Male actors in Hindi cinema
21st-century Indian male actors
Male actors from Delhi